This is a list of state prisons in Texas.

The list includes only those facilities under the supervision of the Texas Department of Criminal Justice and includes some facilities operated under contract by private entities to TDCJ.  It does not include federal prisons or county jails, nor does it include the North Texas State Hospital; though the facility houses those classified as "criminally insane" (such as Andrea Yates) the facility is under the supervision of the Texas Department of State Health Services.

Facilities listed are for males unless otherwise stated.

Facilities operated by the TDCJ

Prisons
Region I

Eastham Unit
Ellis Unit
W.J. Estelle Unit
Ferguson Unit
Thomas Goree Unit
Huntsville Unit – Texas State Penitentiary at Huntsville
Gib Lewis Unit
Allan B. Polunsky Unit
Wynne Unit

Region II
George Beto Unit
William R. Boyd Unit
Coffield Unit
Mark W. Michael Unit
Louie C. Powledge Unit
Barry Telford Unit

Region III
Clemens Unit
Darrington Unit
L.V. Hightower Unit
Jester III Unit (formerly Harlem III)
Ramsey Unit (formerly W. F. Ramsey I Unit)
Mark W. Stiles Unit
Richard P. LeBlanc Unit
Stringfellow Unit (formerly W. F. Ramsey II Unit)
Terrell Unit (formerly W. F. Ramsey III Unit)
Carol Vance Unit (formerly Harlem II and Jester II)

Region IV
Dolph Briscoe Unit
John B. Connally Unit
James Lynaugh Unit
William G. McConnell Unit
Clarence N. Stevenson Unit
Ruben M. Torres Unit

Region V
James V. Allred Unit
William P. "Bill" Clements Unit
Dalhart Unit
Price Daniel Unit
Rufe Jordan Unit
Nathaniel J. Neal Unit
It was previously the only unit for women in West Texas. In 1997 the TDCJ proposed changing it into a men's unit.
T.L. Roach, Jr. Unit (Includes a Boot Camp)
Preston E. Smith Unit
Daniel Webster Wallace Unit

Region VI
Crain Unit (Female) (Formerly the Gatesville Unit)
Hilltop Unit (Female)
William P. Hobby Unit (Female)
Alfred D. Hughes Unit
O.L. Luther Unit
Mountain View Unit (Female)
Dr. Lane Murray Unit (Female)
Wallace Pack Unit
French M. Robertson Unit

State jails

Region II
 Buster Cole State Jail
 Hutchins State Jail
Region III
 Larry Gist State Jail
 Dempsie Henley State Jail (Female)
 Pam Lychner State Jail (originally Atascocita Unit)
 Lucille G. Plane State Jail (Female)
Region IV
 Fabian Dale Dominguez State Jail
 Renaldo V. Lopez State Jail
 Joe Ney State Jail (originally the Hondo Unit)
 Rogelio Sanchez State Jail
Region V
 Marshall Formby State Jail
 J.B. Wheeler State Jail
Region VI
 Travis County State Jail
 Linda Woodman State Jail (Female)

Transfer facilities
Region I
 Glen Ray Goodman Unit
 Joe F. Gurney Unit
 Reverend C.A. Holliday Unit
Region II
 Choice Moore Unit
Region III
 Cotulla Unit
 Fort Stockton Unit
 Garza East Unit (Originally Chase Field East Unit)
 Garza West Unit (Originally Chase Field West Unit)
Region V
 Jim Rudd Unit, named for former State Representative Jim Rudd of Brownfield
 Tulia Unit
 Dick Ware Unit
Region VI
 Marlin Unit
 John W. Middleton Unit
 San Saba Unit

Medical facilities

Region III
 Hospital Galveston (Co-gender)
 Carole S. Young Medical Facility Complex (Female) (formerly Texas City Regional Medical Unit)

Pre-release facilities

Region III
 Richard J. LeBlanc Unit
Region IV
 Manuel A. Segovia Unit
Region VI
 Hamilton Unit
 Thomas Havins Unit

Substance abuse felony punishment facilities

Region II
 Clyde M. Johnston Unit
Region III
 Jester I Unit
Region IV
 Ernestine Glossbrenner Unit
Region VI
 Ellen Halbert Unit (Female)
 Walker Sayle Unit

Psychiatric facilities

Region II
 Skyview Unit (Co-gender)
Region III
 Wayne Scott Unit (formerly Beauford H. Jester IV Unit), renamed in 2021
Region V
 Montford Psychiatric Unit

Geriatric facilities

Region I
 Rufus H. Duncan Geriatric Facility

Mentally challenged offender program
Region II
 Jerry H. Hodge Unit

Privately operated facilities

Private prisons
 Bridgeport Unit
 Cleveland Unit
 Diboll Unit
 Estes Unit (Previously the Venus Unit)
 Kyle Unit (previously known as the Kyle New Vision Unit)
 Lockhart Unit (female only)
 Billy Moore Unit

Private state jails
 Bartlett State Jail (closed)
 Bradshaw State Jail
 Jesse R. Dawson Unit (Co-gender; closed)
 John R. Lindsey Unit
 Willacy County State Jail

Private pre-parole transfer facilities
 Bridgeport Unit
 Mineral Wells Unit

Private work programs
 Lockhart Unit

Private multi-use facilities
 East Texas Multi-Use Facility (Co-gender)

Parole confinement facilities
Region III
Joe Kegans State Jail
Region V
 William P. "Bill" Baten Unit
Private
 Burnet Unit (Co-gender)
 South Texas Unit (Closed)
 West Texas Unit

Former facilities
 Bowie County Unit
 Central Unit (Closed 2011)
 Dickens County Unit
 Don Hutto Unit
 Jefferson County Unit
 Gregg County Unit
 Limestone County Unit
 North Texas Intermediate Sanctions Facility (closed 2011)
 Retrieve Unit (later Wayne Scott Unit) - Main prison closed in 2020
 Western Regional Medical Unit

References

External links
 Texas Department of Criminal Justice

Texas

Prisons